Knitter may refer to
Bernard Knitter (born 1938), Polish Olympic wrestler
Paul F. Knitter, American theologian
The Knitters, American country and folk band
Someone who knits

See also
Yevgeni Kniter (born 1982), Israeli ice hockey player